The Herman Feshbach Prize in Theoretical Nuclear Physics is a prize awarded annually by the American Physical Society to recognize and encourage outstanding achievements in theoretical nuclear physics. The $10,000 prize is in honor of Herman Feshbach of MIT. The prize, inaugurated in 2014, is awarded to one person or is shared among two to three persons when all of the recipients are credited with the same accomplishment.

Prize winners
Source: American Physical Society 
 2014 John W. Negele
 2015 Larry McLerran
 2016 Xiangdong Ji
 2017 Joseph Carlson
 2018 Edward Shuryak
 2019 Barry R. Holstein
 2020 Ubirajara van Kolck
 2021 Berndt Müller

See also
 List of physics awards

References

Awards of the American Physical Society
Awards established in 2014